Chauncey Burr Fisher (January 8, 1872 – April 27, 1939) was a 19th-century Major League Baseball pitcher. Fisher pitched in the National League from 1893 to 1901.

External links
Baseball Reference

1872 births
1939 deaths
19th-century baseball players
Baseball players from Indiana
Major League Baseball pitchers
New York Giants (NL) players
Brooklyn Bridegrooms players
Cincinnati Reds players
Cleveland Spiders players
St. Louis Cardinals players
Minor league baseball managers
Oshkosh Indians players
Buffalo Bisons (minor league) players
Easton Dutchmen players
Indianapolis Hoosiers (minor league) players
Indianapolis Indians players
Omaha Omahogs players
St. Joseph Saints players
St. Paul Apostles players
St. Paul Saints (Western League) players
Chicago White Stockings (minor league) players